Thorp Arch railway station (before 12 June 1961 called Thorp Arch (Boston Spa)) was a station in the parish of Wetherby, West Yorkshire, on the Harrogate–Church Fenton line.  It opened on 10 August 1847 and served nearby Thorp Arch as well as Boston Spa. The station closed to passengers on 6 January 1964 and completely on 10 August 1964.

Location and facilities 

Thorp Arch station was located north of the level crossing with Church Causeway between the villages of Thorp Arch and Walton.

The station building was designed by George Townsend Andrews in the Gothic revival style. The two-storey stationmaster's house is immediately adjacent.  The size of the building and its representative appearance are due to the popularity of nearby Boston Spa, and the latter was the reason for the station called Thorp Arch (Boston Spa) until 1961.

There were two side platforms.  North of station was the goods yard with a long loop serving a cattle dock, a short siding through the goods shed, and another siding with an end dock.  From the latter, two sidings branched off to the coal drops.  The signal box stood on the up side south of the level crossing.

Serving the Royal Ordnance Factory 

Construction of the Thorp Arch Royal Ordnance Factory began in February 1940. Initially, all building materials were delivered to Thorp Arch station. On 24 June 1940 new sidings were opened nearer to the factory. The platforms of Thorp Arch station were extended in June 1941 on order to cope with the increasing passenger traffic. Later, a railway loop with four stations was built around the factory, which joined the Harrogate–Church Fenton line by means of two junctions south of Thorp Arch station.

The internal railway and the traffic associated with the Ordnance Factory is described in two articles "The Thorp Arch And The Circular Railway" by Mike Christensen, British Railway Journal, Part 1 in number 65 and part 2 in 66.

Current situation 

The station building with the stationmaster's house and the down platform are still existing, the building has only undergone few external alterations and is used as private residence. The up platform is demolished. The goods shed is also preserved, and remains of the coal drops are still in place.

The station building and the goods shed (mistakenly referred to as "engine shed") were listed as Grade II in February 1988.

The trackbed can be followed on a bridleway running north to Wetherby and south across Wharfe Bridge to Newton Kyme. Sustrans Route 665.

See also
Listed buildings in Thorp Arch

References 
 

Disused railway stations in North Yorkshire
Beeching closures in England
Railway stations in Great Britain opened in 1847
Railway stations in Great Britain closed in 1964
Wetherby
Former York and North Midland Railway stations
George Townsend Andrews railway stations